Bonito is a name given to various species of fish of the genus Sarda.

Bonito may also refer to:

Fish

 Skipjack tuna is often called "bonito", especially in Japanese cuisine; it is also known as arctic bonito or oceanic bonito
 Bonito flakes or katsuobushi, flakes of dried, fermented skipjack tuna used in Japanese cuisine

Music

 Kero Kero Bonito, a British band from London, England

Places
Bonito, Bahia, a town in Bahia, Brazil
Bonito, Campania, a comune in the Province of Avellino, Italy
Bonito Canyon, Arizona, a 400' deep canyon in the Apache County that was the site of a skirmish between Native Americans and mounted troops on October 17, 1858
Bonito, Mato Grosso do Sul, a municipality in Mato Grosso do Sul, Brazil
Bonito, Pará, a town in Pará, Brazil
Bonito, Pernambuco, a city in Pernambuco, Brazil
Bonito Lake, an alpine reservoir northwest of Ruidoso, New Mexico
Bonito de Minas, a municipality in Minas Gerais, Brazil
Bonito Oriental, a municipality in Colón, Honduras
Bonito de Santa Fé, a municipality in Paraíba, Brazil
Pueblo Bonito, an archeological site in Chaco Culture National Historical Park, New Mexico, U.S.A.
Bonito River (disambiguation) or Rio Bonito, the name of several rivers

Other uses
 Bonito (album), a 2003 album by Jarabe de Palo
 FT Bonito, a kit car by Fiberfab
 A web interface of Sketch Engine, a corpus manager

See also
Bonita (disambiguation)
Rio Bonito (disambiguation)
Benito (disambiguation)